In mathematics, Buchsbaum rings are Noetherian local rings such that every system of parameters is a weak sequence.
A sequence  of the maximal ideal  is called a weak sequence if  for all .

Every Cohen–Macaulay local ring is a Buchsbaum ring. Every Buchsbaum ring is a generalized Cohen–Macaulay ring.

References

Commutative algebra
Ring theory